The 2012 Dubai Women's Sevens was a rugby sevens tournament held between 30 November 2012 and 1 December 2012 at The Sevens Stadium in Dubai. It was the sixth edition of the tournament and the first stop on the 2012–13 IRB Women's Sevens World Series

New Zealand were the first champions of the new series after defeating South Africa 41–0.

Format
The teams were drawn into three pools of four teams each. Each team played everyone in their pool one time. The top two teams from each pool advanced to the Cup/Plate brackets. The bottom two teams from each group went to the Bowl brackets.

Pool stage

Pool A

Pool B

Pool C

Knockout stage

Cup

Plate

Bowl

References

2012–13
2012–13 IRB Women's Sevens World Series
rugby union
2012 in women's rugby union
2012 rugby sevens competitions
2012 in Asian rugby union